Ambohimahasoa District is a district in central Madagascar. It is part of Haute Matsiatra Region. Its capital is Ambohimahasoa.

Communes
The district is further divided into 17 communes:

 Ambalakindresy
 Ambatosoa
 Ambohimahasoa
 Ambohinamboarina
 Ampitana
 Ankafina-Tsarafidy
 Ankerana
 Befeta
 Camp Robin
 Fiadanana
 Isaka
 Ikalalao
 Manandroy
 Morafeno
 Sahatona
 Sahave
 Vohiposa

Roads
The district is crossed by two national roads: the National road 7 and the National road 25.

References

Districts of Haute Matsiatra